Sanger Unified School District is a public school district in Fresno County, California, United States. The district operates 20 schools, serving 11,360 students.

Sanger Unified was established on November 17, 1964, effective July 1, 1965. On that date, Sanger Union joined with Fairmont Union, Centerville Union, and Lone Star Union to create the Sanger Unified School District. SUSD annexed Del Rey Union the next year, on July 1, 1966.

References

External links
 

School districts in Fresno County, California
1964 establishments in California
School districts established in 1964